The University of Zulia (also known as LUZ literally meaning "light" in Spanish), is a public university whose main campus is located in the city of Maracaibo, Venezuela. LUZ is one of the largest and most important universities of Venezuela.

The University of Zulia has three campuses: two in Zulia State, in the cities of Maracaibo (being the biggest and most important of the three) and Cabimas; and one in the city of Punto Fijo, located in Falcón State.

History 

The history of the university begins when a decree converting the Federal College of Maracaibo into the University of Zulia was passed on May 29, 1891.  The university itself began its operations on September 11 of that same year.  Its first Chancellor was Francisco Ochoa.

In 1909, the government ordered the closure of the university for political reasons.  It would remain closed until October 1, 1946.  This event is known as La Reapertura (The Reopening). The first Chancellor after the reopening was Jesús Enrique Lossada.

Academics
The university offers the following undergraduate programs:

School of Agronomy
Agronomy
School of Architecture and Design
Architecture
Graphic Design
School of Arts
Fine Arts
Dance
Theatre
Visual Arts
Music
Museology
School of Dentistry
Dentistry
School of Economical & Social Sciences
Business Administration
Accounting
Sociology
Economics
School of Engineering
Civil Engineering
Electrical Engineering
Geodesic Engineering
Industrial Engineering
Petroleum Engineering
Chemical Engineering
Mechanical Engineering
School of Humanities & Education
Literature
Philosophy
Information Science
Journalism
Education
School of Law & Political Sciences
Law
Social Work
Political Science
School of Medicine
Bioanalysis
Nursing
Medicine
Nutrition
School of Sciences
Biology
Computer Science
Physics
Mathematics
Chemistry
Anthropology
School of Veterinary Medicine
Veterinary Medicine

External links

University of Zulia (in Spanish)

 
Universities in Venezuela
Buildings and structures in Maracaibo
Educational institutions established in 1891
1891 establishments in Venezuela